Oscar Louis Auf der Heide (December 8, 1874 – March 29, 1945) was an American businessman and Democratic Party politician who represented New Jersey in the United States House of Representatives for five terms from 1925 to 1935.

Early life and career
Auf der Heide was born in New York City on December 8, 1874 and attended the public schools. He moved with his parents to West New York, New Jersey in 1887, where he later was engaged in the real estate business.

Political career
He was a member of the town council from 1899–1902, and was a member and president of the board of education of the West New York School District in 1903-04. Auf der Heide was a member of the New Jersey General Assembly from 1908-11. He served on the board of assessors of West New York in 1912 and 1913 and was Mayor of West New York, New Jersey from 1914-17. He was elected as a member and subsequently a director of the Hudson County Board of Chosen Freeholders, serving in office from 1915-24.

Congress
Auf der Heide was elected as a Democrat to the Sixty-ninth Congress and to the four succeeding Congresses, serving in office from  March 4, 1925 until January 3, 1935. In redistricting following the United States Census, 1930, he was shifted to the newly created 14th congressional district. He was not a candidate for renomination in 1934 to the Seventy-fourth Congress.

Death
After leaving Congress, he resumed the real estate and insurance business.

He died in West New York, New Jersey on March 29, 1945, aged 70, and was interred in Hoboken Cemetery in North Bergen.

References

External links

1874 births
1945 deaths
Mayors of places in New Jersey
County commissioners in New Jersey
School board members in New Jersey
Democratic Party members of the United States House of Representatives from New Jersey
People from West New York, New Jersey
Politicians from New York City